This is a list of the fifty most populous metropolitan areas in South America as of 2015, the most recent year for which official census results, estimates or projections are available for every major metropolitan area in South America. All figures refer to mid-year populations.

Notes

References

 
South America
Metropolitan areas